The Asian Football Confederation's Pre-Olympic Tournament was held from 5 April 2003 to 12 May 2004.  Thirty-six teams entered the qualification for the three allocated spots for the 2004 Summer Olympics Football tournament in Athens.

The qualification saw Korea Republic, Japan and Iraq winning their final round groups and qualifying to the Olympics.

Format 
Asian berths for the final is 3.

Preliminary round
12 highest seeded teams received byes for the second round. Other 24 teams were paired, where each pair played home and away. The 12 winners would advance to the second round.
Second round
24 teams were paired, where each pair played home and away. The 12 winners would advance to the final round.
Final round
12 teams were grouped into 3 groups of 4 teams each, where each group would consist of home and away round-robin tournament. The winners of each group would qualify to the finals.

Preliminary round 1

Turkmenistan won 2 – 1 on aggregate and advanced to the Second Round.

1 – 1 on aggregate; Lebanon won on away goals and advanced to the Second Round.

Singapore won 5 – 3 on aggregate and advanced to the Second Round.

Iraq won 4 – 2 on aggregate and advanced to the Second Round.

Oman won 17 – 0 on aggregate and advanced to the Second Round.

Hong Kong won 3 – 0 on aggregate and advanced to the Second Round.

Myanmar won 3 – 0 on aggregate and advanced to the Second Round.

Palestine won 3 – 1 on aggregate and advanced to the Second Round.

Syria won 8 – 1 on aggregate and advanced to the Second Round.

United Arab Emirates won 4 – 0 on aggregate and advanced to the Second Round.

Maldives withdrew. Iran advanced to the Second Round.

Yemen withdrew. Kyrgyzstan advanced to the Second Round.

Preliminary round 2

South Korea won 3 – 0 on aggregate and advanced to the Final Round.

Lebanon won 5 – 2 on aggregate and advanced to the Final Round.

Saudi Arabia won 10 – 0 on aggregate and advanced to the Final Round.

Iraq won 4 – 3 on aggregate and advanced to the Final Round.

Oman won 2 – 1 on aggregate and advanced to the Final Round.

Bahrain won 7 – 2 on aggregate and advanced to the Final Round.

Japan won 8 – 0 on aggregate and advanced to the Final Round.

Kuwait won 3 – 2 on aggregate and advanced to the Final Round.

China won 4 – 3 on aggregate and advanced to the Final Round.

United Arab Emirates won 5 – 2 on aggregate and advanced to the Final Round.

Iran won 9 – 2 on aggregate and advanced to the Final Round.

Turkmenistan withdrew due to SARS fears. Malaysia advanced to the Final Round.

Preliminary round 3
The final round was played in three groups of four teams each held from 1 March to 12 May 2004. The winner of each group will represent Asia at the 2004 Olympic Games.

Group A

South Korea qualify to the 2004 Summer Olympics Football tournament in Athens.

Group B

Japan qualify to the 2004 Summer Olympics Football tournament in Athens.

Group C

Iraq qualify to the 2004 Summer Olympics Football tournament in Athens.

See also
Football at the 2004 Summer Olympics
Football at the 2004 Summer Olympics – Women's qualification#AFC (Asia)

External links
 
 

Football qualification for the 2004 Summer Olympics
Football at the Summer Olympics – Men's Asian Qualifiers